Jurassic Park: The Ride is a water-based amusement ride based on the Steven Spielberg 1993 film Jurassic Park and Michael Crichton's 1990 novel of the same name which the film is based on located at Universal's Islands of Adventure in Orlando, Florida and Universal Studios Japan in Osaka. It was formerly located at Universal Studios Hollywood in Universal City, California, where it was turned into Jurassic World: The Ride.

The ride was researched and built as the film was still in production and opened at Universal Studios Hollywood on June 21, 1996. Duplicates of the ride have since been built at Universal's Islands of Adventure and Universal Studios Japan as Jurassic Park River Adventure. A river rapids ride version, Jurassic Park Rapids Adventure, opened at Universal Studios Singapore in 2010.

History

Inspiration
The ride was inspired by a line of scenes from Michael Crichton's  1990 novel when Alan Grant, Lex Murphy, and Tim Murphy try to get back to the visitor center on an inflatable boat. Elements like the  Tyrannosaurus rex chasing the boat, Two baby Raptors (novel)/Compsognathus (or Procompsognathus, film & novel) on a boat from an earlier scene, the pair of Dilophosaurus on the river bank, and the drop (ride)/waterfall (novel), were used on the ride.

Opening
Jurassic Park: The Ride opened to the public at Universal Studios Hollywood on June 21, 1996. Among the guests in attendance at the ride's grand opening celebration  were film cast members Jeff Goldblum, Ariana Richards and Joseph Mazzello. Steven Spielberg also attended the opening, but requested that he be let off of the attraction before the  drop. On August 12, 1996, Universal launched an online game, Jurassic Park  The Ride Online Adventure, to promote the ride.

Meanwhile, Universal Studios Florida was looking to build their own version of Jurassic Park: The Ride. It would be placed in their brand new second theme park Universal's Islands of Adventure. The park would feature islands themed to Marvel superheroes, Dr. Seuss books, fairy tales, cartoons and dinosaurs. Jurassic Park: The Ride would be slightly different from the Hollywood location. The ride would be named Jurassic Park: River Adventure and feature some significant changes. On March 27, 1999, Islands of Adventure opened for technical rehearsals, with Jurassic Park: River Adventure being one of its debut attractions. On May 28, 1999, the attraction officially opened to the public.

During the development, Universal Studios Japan was planning to add Jurassic Park: River Adventure. It would be a mirror version of the Islands of Adventure location. Jurassic Park: River Adventure opened on March 31, 2001, along with the park.

Closure and rebranding
On May 10, 2018, it was announced that the Hollywood location would be receiving a Jurassic World remodel. The attraction was becoming outdated due to the film's huge success in 2015. Jurassic Park: The Ride would have its last operating day on September 3, 2018; the ride then closed September 4. After being closed for 10 months, it reopened on July 12, 2019, as Jurassic World: The Ride. The ride includes all new animatronics and special effects.

Universal Studios Hollywood

Queue and pre-show
The ride was designed to replicate the atmosphere of Isla Nublar. Guests began the queue by walking under the Jurassic Park Sign before waiting under an open-wall building. A tour guide appeared on television monitors in the building, reviewing boarding and ride safety. Other videos played with some about the "safety of the ride" spoken by InGen employees, John Hammond (Richard Attenborough) talking about the dinosaurs, and music from the first film's score in the background. Guests were then split into two lines to board their rafts.

Ride

As riders' rafts entered the main gate into Ultrasaur Lagoon, a mother Ultrasaurus (Brachiosaurus on the ride's promotional website)  and her young were seen feeding and communicating with each other. A pair of Psittacosaurus also grazed and hid in the tall grass. The raft then moved behind a waterfall and emerged in Stegosaur Springs, where riders see an adult Stegosaurus and its young. Two Compsognathus (Procompsognathus on the ride's promotional website) were fighting over an empty popcorn box before the raft enters Hadrosaur Cove, where a Parasaurolophus popped up and sprayed water at riders. An announcement was heard from Jurassic Park Animal Control, saying that the Parasaurolophus had thrown the raft off-course and caused it to enter the raptor containment area, which riders could see had been heavily damaged.

Riders then encountered an abandoned raft where a Dilophosaurus could be seen with the remains of a poncho between its teeth. A nearby motorboat was also abandoned, sent by Jurassic Park Animal Control to guide the raft towards a safe area, but the Dilophosaurus appeared to have killed its crew as well. A Mickey Mouse hat was seen floating in the water next to a ruined raft, an apparent jab at Universal Hollywood's theme park rival Disneyland. To the raft's right, the growls of a Tyrannosaurus rex were heard, and a heavily damaged tour vehicle was seen being pushed over the wall—a homage to the original movie where Tim Murphy is thrown off a ledge in a tour vehicle.

Some Dilophosaurus jumped out and spat their toxic venom (actually water) at guests. Sparks and floodlights were added to the effect during nighttime rides.

The raft then entered the Environmental Systems Building (which had special effects other versions of the ride don't) and began to ascend a long lift hill. A voice on a loudspeaker alerted guests that an emergency evacuation would be attempted. As the raft progressed up the hill, numerous alarms were heard and some escaped Velociraptors lunged out at riders. When the raft reached the top of the hill, it dropped down a small waterfall, just as a Tyrannosaurus broke through the ceiling and lunged out at the riders from above, accompanied by collapsing pipes.

A technician began counting down when the building's life support systems would terminate (due to "toxic gases" released during the Tyrannosaurus encounter). The raft then climbed a small lift hill that brought it closer to the emergency evacuation drop. A second technician yelled, "If you can hear my voice, get out of there! It's in the building! IT'S IN THE BUILDING!".

The Tyrannosaurus then emerged from a waterfall coming from broken pipes in front of the raft, and lunged down to grab the raft, which escaped by plunging down an  drop into a tropical lagoon outside the Environmental Systems Building. A Dilophosaurus made a final attempt to squirt "venom" (water) at the passengers. A can of Barbasol was seen in the planter just before the ride ended, a reference to the can Dennis Nedry uses in the first film to steal dinosaur embryos. The raft then made its way to the unloading dock where guests disembarked through the Jurassic Outfitters gift shop.

Universal's Islands of Adventure and Universal Studios Japan

Ride
The ride begins as the raft rises against an elevation, followed by a small plunge. It then enters the Jurassic Park Gate. Japan's version is a mirror of Orlando's, as they operate in opposite directions (for instance, rafts in Japan tend to be at the right towards the gate, as opposed to the left in Orlando).

In the Ultrasaur Lagoon, the visitor encounters a large adult Ultrasaurus/Brachiosaurus which raises its neck high above the riders, then slowly lowers it back near the water to feed. Two Psittacosaurus in the lagoon graze on plants and drink from the river nearby. The raft goes through a cave with water trickling down its sides. Riders then enter Stegosaur Springs, a "volcanic" area like Stegosaurus South in the novel. An adult and baby Stegosaurus stand on either side of the river.

The raft begins to head toward a part of the park known as Hadrosaur Cove. A Parasaurolophus pokes its head up from the water and shoots water from its nose onto guests. Seconds later, another startled Parasaurolophus jars the raft, causing it to drift into the Raptor Containment Area, which is shown to be heavily damaged. Jurassic Park Animal Control addresses riders through loudspeakers, telling them to stop the raft and get to a safe place. (Voice-overs on the ride explain that the Raptor Containment Area was a section that had never been successfully integrated into the rest of the park.)

Off in the jungle area to the right, Raptors can be heard rustling the bushes and plants. The raft passes a replica of the Raptor Pen from the film, and  branches move, simulating the creatures attempts to escape their confines. A large hole is torn in the wires of the fence. Two Compsognathus/Procompsognathus are seen fighting over a bloody crew shirt, and the boat ("CP 25") is seen that Animal Control sent to guide the riders towards a safe area; the Compsognathus have apparently attacked and killed the crew. The raft heads toward the water treatment plant, where riders see a Velociraptor run into a dark corner. A large crate with something snarling inside, possibly a raptor, nearly falls and crushes the riders.

The riders then begin to slowly head up a steep hill into a large building in silence and darkness. The riders then enter a dark tunnel with several pipes near the ceiling. To the right of the riders, there is a shadow of two raptors growling inside a pen. A Velociraptor now jumps out of a dark corner and begins squealing and clawing at a gate sparking with electricity. Another raptor is seen jumping up from a control panel and snarls at guests. As the raft follows a short drop and a right turn, sirens begin blazing loudly due to an evacuation. only to stop seconds later. Suddenly, a loud Dilophosaurus squeal is heard, followed by a frill-less Dilophosaurus snarling at the riders. A loud roar then can be heard, and a large three-fingered claw mark can be seen ripping through the wall. Moments after, a few Dilophosaurus jump up beside the raft, spitting their "venom" (actually water) at the guests. In front of the riders is a couple of flashing lights as well as mist and fog. Seconds later, the head of the Tyrannosaurus rex appears in front of the riders, roaring and growling. It roars very loudly and bends over snapping its jaws and then raises its mouth towards the ceiling. As the Tyrannosaurus bends its head down to try to eat the riders, the raft then plunges down an 85 ft 51° drop and the on-ride photo is taken. On September 28, 2022, Hurricane Ian severely damaged the Orlando version of the ride. Reports showed that walls close to the main drop were ripped off.

Jurassic Park in the Dark

During Universal Studios Hollywood's annual "Halloween Horror Nights", the ride was temporarily renamed "Jurassic Park in the Dark". Most of the lights in the Environmental Systems Building near the end of the ride were turned off, and the ride's original soundtrack was replaced with "Welcome to the Jungle" by Guns N' Roses.

See also

 List of Jurassic Park water rides
 List of amusement rides based on film franchises
 Dinosaur, a similarly themed attraction at the Disney's Animal Kingdom.

References

Jurassic Park in amusement parks
Water rides
Amusement rides introduced in 1996
Former Universal Studios Hollywood attractions
Universal Parks & Resorts attractions by name
Amusement rides based on film franchises
Animatronic attractions
1996 establishments in California
1999 establishments in Florida
2001 establishments in Japan
2018 disestablishments in California